Presenting Dionne Warwick is the debut studio album by American singer Dionne Warwick. It was released by Scepter Records on February 10, 1963 in the United States. Composers Burt Bacharach and Hal David provided three-quarters of the track listing, having met Warwick during the summer of 1961 at Bell Sound Studios when she was working as a background singer during the recording session for The Drifters' minor hit "Mexican Divorce" (1962). The songwriters would go on to become frequent collaborators on subsequent Warwick projects. Presenting Dionne Warwick peaked at number 14 on the UK Albums Chart and spawned the lead single "Don't Make Me Over" which reached number five on the US Hot R&B Singles chart and became a top-forty hit on several international charts.

Background
Presenting Dionne Warwick is notable for including "Don't Make Me Over", Warwick's debut single, as well as "Wishin' & Hopin'", which would become a hit for Dusty Springfield in 1964, "It's Love That Really Counts", which brought Warwick to the attention of Scepter owner Florence Greenberg, and "Make It Easy on Yourself". "Zip-a-Dee-Doo-Dah" features backing vocals by Dionne's sister Dee Dee Warwick and The Shirelles. Presenting Dionne Warwick was digitally remastered and reissued on CD on May 15, 2007 by Collectors' Choice Music.

Critical reception

In the 21st century, Allmusic editor Lindsay Planer gave the album four stars out of five. She wrote:
Warwick's inviting voice was at the core of their successful working relationship, coupled with the undeniably unique and expertly crafted material, yielding a host of classics such as "Wishin' and Hopin'." The version here predates Dusty Springfield's rendering and was likewise much of the reason Springfield chose to cover it to begin with. Other seminal entries featured on Presenting Dionne Warwick are "Make It Easy on Yourself" and the lovelorn melancholy ballad "I Cry Alone," as well as the unique arrangement of "Zip-A-Dee-Doo-Dah."

Track listing

Charts

References

External links
Presenting Dionne Warwick at Discogs

1963 debut albums
Dionne Warwick albums
Albums produced by Burt Bacharach
Albums produced by Hal David
Scepter Records albums